Toobin may refer to:

 Jeffrey Toobin (born 1960), American legal analyst
 Jerome Toobin (1919–1984), American television producer and father of Jeffrey
 Toobin', a 1988 arcade game by Atari and later ported to many other platforms

See also
 Toobing or tubing